The Darlot-Centenary Gold Mine is a gold mine located 58 km east of Leinster, Western Australia.

It is operated by Red 5 Limited since the sale from Gold Fields Australia in 2017 where, since the beginning of 2008, it was part of Gold Fields Yilgarn South operation, which consisted of Darlot, the Lawlers Gold Mine and the Granny Smith Gold Mine. The mine is located in the Yandal Greenstone Belt.

History

Ore at Darlot-Centenary is mined in an underground operation at the Centenary deposit, discovered in 1996 next to the Darlot Gold Mine, which had a historical production in excess of 500,000 ounces. Homestake began mining the Centenary deposit in 1998.

The site, was originally owned by Sundowner Minerals, which was taken over by Forsayth group, then Plutonic Resources, a major Australian gold mining and exploration company. Homestake Mining Company purchased Plutonic in April 1998 for more than $1.0 billion, and, in turn, Homestake was acquired by Barrick Gold at the end of 2001.

In October 2013, Barrick finalised the sale of their Australian Yilgarn South mines, consisting of the Granny Smith, Lawlers and Darlot-Centenary mines, to Goldfields. Barrick sold the mines as it considered them high-cost and required cash to compensate for the rising cost of its Pascua-Lama gold project. The three mines accounted for six percent of Barrick's annual gold output at the time. Goldfields purchased the mines for US$300 million, half of which had to be paid in cash while the other half could be issued in shares.

In August 2017, Red 5 Limited purchased the Darlot mine from Gold Fields for A$18.5 million, A$12 million of this in cash and the remainder in shares. At the same time, the company also purchased the King of the Hills Gold Mine from Saracens Mineral Holdings for A$15.5 million in cash and shares.

With the completion of their new processing plant at the King of the Hills Gold Mine, Red 5 will close down the Darlot process plant in 2022 and instead process the ore from the mine's underground operations at the new facility.

Production
Annual production of the mine:

Darlot
Production figures as a stand-alone operation:

Yilgarn South
Production figures for the Yilgarn South operation, consisting of Darlot, Granny Smith and Lawlers:

Darlot
Production figures as a stand-alone operation:

References

Bibliography

External links 
 
 MINEDEX website: Darlot Database of the Department of Mines, Industry Regulation and Safety

Gold mines in Western Australia
Surface mines in Australia
Underground mines in Australia
Shire of Leonora
Barrick Gold